Magar Kham (मगर खाम), also known as Kham, Kham Magar, and Khamkura, is the Sino-Tibetan language variety of the Northern Magar people of Nepal. The language is situated in the upper elevations of Baglung, East Rukum, and Rolpa districts. Based on census data taken in 2011, the total population of Magar Kham is estimated to be about 69,000 speakers.

Language classification 
Magar Kham is a Sino-Tibetan language, and it is classified by David Bradley as “Central Himalayan,” and as being related to Magar and Chepang and more distantly related to the Kiranti languages. George van Driem also classifies Magar Kham as “Para-Kiranti,” emphasizing that Magar Kham, Magar, and Chepang are united more by their differences from the Kiranti cluster than by their similarity to one another. Within this cluster, Magar Kham possesses a number of unique grammatical features, and shares only 44% lexical similarity with Magar and 38% with Chepang.

Dialects 
Magar Kham speakers generally refer to their dialect using the name of an important village or river in conjunction with the Nepali instrumental suffix [-le] or the genitive suffix [-i]. Thus, it can be said that Magar Kham has as many dialects as there are villages and rivers in their native territory. The table below presents the major dialects of the Magar Kham language as they have been classified by David E. Watters. The ISO 639-3 codes associated with each major dialect are presented in brackets.

Magar Kham varieties 

At the highest level in the table, Kham has been divided into Gamal Kham, Sheshi Kham, and Parbate Kham, which is further divided into Eastern and Western Parbate Kham. As previously stated, these four major dialects are mutually unintelligible and bear unique grammatical innovations indicative of different languages. For this reason, each of these dialects have been given its own ISO 639-3 designation.

Speakers 
Based on the census data taken in 2011, the total population of Magar Kham speakers is estimated to be about 69,000 persons. The tables below presents the homeland population estimates by district and by dialect. It is estimated that about 15,000 Magar Kham speakers live in diaspora.

Magar Kham population by district

Magar Kham population by dialect/variety 
According to Ethnologue:

Estimates are based on the number of persons registering their mother tongue as either “Magar” or “Kham” within the territory of the northern Magars.

Language vitality 
Although their homeland is fairly homogeneous, northern Magars are multilingual. The national language of Nepali is spoken confidently by all individuals under 35 years old. In some communities (Sheshi and Eastern Parbate), parents have shifted to speaking Nepali with their children, and the speaker population is gradually decreasing. However, in all of East Rukum and in the Gam river valley of Rolpa, the language is being vigorously transmitted. Ethnologue has assigned the following EGIDS levels to each variety:
 Western Parbate Kham [kjl]: level 5 (Developing)
 Eastern Parbate Kham [kif]: level 6b (Threatened)
 Gamal Kham [kgj]: level 6a (Vigorous)
 Sheshi Kham [kip]: level 6b (Threatened)

The UNESCO Endangered Languages Project has classified Gamal Kham as "Vulnerable."

Phonology

Consonants
Taka dialect of Western Parbate Kham has 22 consonant phonemes while Gamal Kham possesses around 29 to 30 consonant phonemes.

 green phonemes do not occur in Parbate Kham.
 the phonemes in Light salmon colour appear in Ghusbang and Sheram dialect. All others appear in every Kham dialect.
 The rhotic  is realized as a trill  at the end of words. Otherwise, it is a flap.

Vowels
Taka dialect of Western Parbate has 25 vowel phonemes.

 Light salmon vowels occur in every dialect of Kham.
 Breathy vowels 
 Diphthongs

Tone
See vocal registers.

Writing

Consonants

Vowels

Vowels for Gamal Kham

Reconstruction
Proto-Kham has been reconstructed by Watters (2002). Proto-Kham reconstructions from Watters (2002: 443–456) are given below.

A. Body parts
 *r-dzəŋ ~ *b-dzəŋ 'back'
 *yep 'back (upper)'
 *phuː 'belly'
 *dziːh 'blood'
 *klaŋ 'body'
 *s-rus 'bone'
 *nun 'breast'
 *sək 'breath'
 *r-mehsiŋ 'buttocks'
 *r-tso 'cheek'
 *r-na 'ear'
 *(ba)r-zut 'egg'
 *mik 'eye'
 *s-ŋa 'face'
 *sot 'fat'
 *r-sin 'fingernail'
 *kəŋ 'foot'
 *r-nihl 'gums'
 *r-ta 'guts'
 *muhl 'hair (body)'
 *p-tsem 'hair (head)'
 *kut 'hand'
 *r-la 'the under-arm area; side of the body'
 *s-r-ŋat 'head'
 *s-yiŋ 'heart'
 *b-rəhŋ 'horn'
 *sya 'animal'
 *r-khap 'jawbone'
 *kəl 'kidney'
 *p-sin 'liver'
 *yaːh 'mouth'
 *s-məŋ 'mustache'
 *r-dehŋ 'neck'
 *s-nat 'nose'
 *r-dzihs 'piss'
 *s-nis 'pus'
 *b-rəhm 'rib'
 *p-s-til 'saliva'
 *kli 'shit'
 *r-kək 'excrement in the intestine of a slaughtered animal'
 *s-pum 'shoulder'
 *r-sa 'sinew'
 *l-kota 'skin'
 *r-nahp 'snot'
 *r-meh 'tail'
 *r-pihl 'tears'
 *r-b-yah 'thigh (upper side)'
 *p-s-le 'tongue'
 *ha-p-sya 'tooth'
 *wohs 'vomit'
 *hwaŋ 'waist'
 *r-mil ~ *s-mil 'wind pipe'
 *kər 'wing'
B. Pronouns/kinship terms/nouns referring to humans'
 *dahpa 'bachelor'
 *za 'child'
 *nan 'friend'
 *b-re 'husband'
 *dahme 'maiden'
 *r-min 'name'
 *r-mi; *ruː 'person'
 *s-lepa 'man, male human'
 *miːma 'woman, female human' < *mi 'person' + *ma 'female'
 *nana 'sister (older)'
 *nam 'sister (younger)'
 *nəŋ 'thou'
 *dzya 'wife'
C. Foodstuff
 *bəhres 'bread'
 *tsip 'curry'
 *r-zəm 'food'
 *s-ŋən 'herbs'
 *raŋrəi 'millet'
 *r-mo 'mushroom'
 *hek 'parched grain'
 *tuk 'poison'
 *(ya)kaŋ 'rice (cooked)'
 *plima 'wheat'
D. Animal names or animal products
 *səhr 'antelope'
 *nim 'bear'
 *r-pen 'bedbug'
 *b-zin 'bee'
 *bwa 'bird'
 *s-puŋ 'chick'
 *gəl 'boar (wild)'
 *b-s-rut 'bug'
 *s-raŋ 'cat'
 *har 'cow'
 *kaːh 'dog'
 *ŋah 'fish'
 *tek 'frog'
 *ra  'goat'
 *r-ta 'horse'
 *r-pəti 'leech'
 *la 'leopard'
 *syar 'louse'
 *s-p-yu; *s-p-ya 'monkey'
 *srəm 'otter'
 *b-rəhŋ 'pheasant'
 *wə 'pig'
 *bi 'rat'
 *luk 'sheep'
 *guhl 'snake'
 *daŋ 'python, constricting snake'
 *p-s-yap 'squirrel (flying)'
 *s-kyar 'woodpecker'
 *p-sən 'wool'
E. Natural objects or phenomena; the inanimate landscape; vegetable and mineral kingdoms
 *r-plah 'ashes'
 *kər 'branch'
 *r-pup 'cave'
 *la 'day'
 *tshyam 'a certain day'
 *b-rih 'dirt'
 *r-gəm 'earth'
 *rihm 'evening'
 *ehŋ 'field'
 *baŋ 'a field, meadow, bowl shaped valley'
 *meh 'fire'
 *p-set 'fruit'
 *tshi 'grass'
 *kuŋ 'hole'
 *dzəhŋ 'iron'
 *s-la 'leaf'
 *r-nahm 'low country'
 *p-s-ya + *hwot 'moon'
 *goŋ 'mountain'
 *rik; *mun 'night'
 *r-wa 'rain'
 *bəih 'river'
 *yem 'road'
 *s-rin 'root'
 *sa + *pik 'salt'
 *nup 'set (sun)'
 *saŋ 'shadow'
 *nəm 'sky'
 *mihkut 'smoke' < *meːh 'fire' + *ku 'smoke'
 *r-pom 'snow'
 *səro 'star'
 *r-dzuht 'stick'
 *luŋ 'stone'
 *nəmi(y) 'sun'
 *b-zu 'thorn'
 *siŋ 'tree'
 *riːh 'water'
 *rihmun 'cooking water' < *riːh 'water' + *mun 'warm'
 *rəhm 'weed'
F. Artifacts and social organization
 *r-wan 'arrowhead'
 *r-wa 'axe'
 *r-beh(k) 'basket'
 *li 'bow'
 *tshəm 'bridge'
 *pəsi(-s) 'broom'
 *kwa 'cloth'
 *yahm 'door'
 *b-rihŋ 'drum'
 *'gor 'circle'
 *muhthap 'hearth' < *muh 'burn' + *thap 'hearth'
 *zihm 'house'
 *r-bəŋ 'lower storey of house; cattle byre'
 *khor 'knife'
 *gur 'load'
 *tən 'sleeping mat'
 *b-lo 'large bamboo mat'
 *tshum 'mortar'
 *r-gəp 'a small needle'
 *r-khap 'a large needle'
 *b-zəhn 'net'
 *r-gum 'pillow'
 *gohr 'plow'
 *b-dza 'pot'
 *p-sip 'sheath'
 *tsihŋ 'snare'
 *gel 'spirit'
 *naŋkhar; *nam 'village'
 *ehn 'work'
 *kum 'yoke'
G. Spatial/directional
 *glahŋ 'across'
 *chin 'behind'
 *khar 'center'
 *me 'down'
 *s-ŋa 'front'
 *thək 'upright'
 *a-sniŋ 'year'
 *rta-sniŋ 'last year'
 *pərniŋ 'next year'
H. Numerals and quantifiers
 *tə 'one'
 *nehs 'two'
 *sohm 'three'
 *b-zi 'four'
 *r-ŋa 'five'
I. Verbs of utterance, body position or function
 *sən; *so 'awaken'
 *klik 'cry'
 *eh 'defecate'
 *si 'die'
 *b-yi 'fart'
 *sas 'laugh'
 *p-s-rat 'to play'
 *b-s-res 'toy, plaything'
 *nah 'rest'
 *tsuŋ 'sit'
 *r-ŋəhl; *em; *ruk ~ *ru-t 'sleep'
 *s-ip 'to put to sleep'
 *p-tshis 'sneeze'
 *s-paŋ 'speak'
 *tsyahŋ 'stand'
 *kəlet 'tickle'
 *r-dzihs 'urinate'
 *who-t 'vomit' < CAUS. of wohs 'to spurt out'
 *gəhr 'weep'
J. Verbs of motion
 *kles 'arrive'
 *rə-t 'bring'
 *plu-s 'climb'
 *huŋ 'come'
 *plu-s 'emerge'
 *s-plu-t 'cause to emerge, expel'
 *te-s 'fall'
 *s-bur 'fly'
 *z-ba 'go'
 *b-la 'graze'
 *mohŋ 'hide'
 *zok 'run'
K. Verbs of emotion, cognition, perception
 *r-məŋ 'dream'
 *p-tshet 'fear'
 *s-meŋ 'forget'
 *that 'hear'
 *thas 'to be heard, audible'
 *sən 'know'
 *r-ses 'something, to know how'
 *r-sək 'proud'
 *rəhŋ 'see'
 *p-tsyu 'to look'
 *s-ŋər; *s-nəm 'smell'
 *b-ris 'tingle'
L. Stative verbs with human patients
 *məhŋ 'drunk'
 *sot 'fat'
 *kre 'hunger'
 *na 'ill'
 *so 'itchy'
 *tshaŋ 'pure'
 *tsos 'thirst'
M. Stative verbs with non-human patients
 *pək 'bad'
 *li 'be'
 *p-se 'bear fruit'
 *s-ta-s 'become'
 *ka 'bitter'
 *pak 'broken'
 *mom 'bud'
 *p-set 'bud'
 *r-pu-s 'burst'
 *zihm; *gim 'cold'
 *s-ta 'collapsed'
 *s-kluŋ 'detach'
 *thəŋ 'dried'
 *yək 'full'
 *p-tsa 'good'
 *s-len 'greasy'
 *piŋ 'green'
 *gis < *s-lis 'heavy'
 *s-gwaŋ 'hole'
 *b-rah 'hot'
 *wyi 'leak'
 *bom 'light'
 *s-lo; *b-re 'long'
 *dzöhl 'loose'
 *mah 'lost'
 *s-dem ~ *them 'low'
 *khət 'matched'
 *sahr 'new'
 *gyahm 'red'
 *mihn 'ripe'
 *tsik 'rotten'
 *lum 'round'
 *p-tsha 'sharp'
 *tun 'short'
 *zim 'small'
 *b-sir 'sour'
 *tuk 'spicy'
 *sli-s 'stale'
 *b-rehk 'sweet'
 *ruhŋ 'thick'
 *plek 'thin'
 *wa 'to be thin (esp. of boards)'
 *mun 'warm'
 *pal 'white'
 *plaŋ 'bright, illuminated'
N. Action verbs with human agent
 *s-po 'beat'
 *ŋih 'beg'
 *kəi 'bite'
 *s-mut 'blow'
 *phut 'to blow with bellows'
 *r-lap 'bore'
 *s-kle(t) 'break'
 *hip 'burn'
 *r-duhp 'butt'
 *ləhŋ 'buy'
 *b-lot 'to lend to someone'
 *b-los 'to borrow'
 *guhr 'carry'
 *kloh 'catch'
 *kwa-t 'clothe'
 *r-sat 'comb'
 *phin 'cook'
 *mihn 'to cook until done'
 *tso 'to boil'
 *kəp 'cover'
 *pəl 'cut'
 *kri 'to cut meat'
 *p-syah 'dance'
 *goh 'dig'
 *gəp 'draw water'
 *zya 'eat'
 *kəi 'to eat things which require chewing'
 *hat 'extract'
 *z-dət 'find'
 *z-dup 'gather'
 *ya 'give'
 *p-set 'grind'
 *r-guh 'guard'
 *tup 'hammer'
 *tsho 'herd'
 *phok 'husk'
 *lut 'insert'
 *tak 'install'
 *r-then 'kick'
 *saht 'kill'
 *kek 'ladle'
 *b-rihm 'lay wall'
 *lep 'lick'
 *dzət 'make'
 *pek 'milk'
 *z-bra-t 'mix'
 *pho-t 'open'
 *phok 'pay'
 *tik 'pick up'
 *s-krəp 'pin closed'
 *p-tsil 'pinch'
 *p-sut 'plug'
 *tek 'press'
 *dzəhk 'put'
 *nat 'to set down, place'
 *ra-s 'release'
 *phit 'remove from fire'
 *tsep 'ride'
 *s-ŋo 'roast'
 *b-zu 'rub'
 *p-sil 'to scrub'
 *s-lom 'scald'
 *sim 'scoop'
 *s-pik 'scrape'
 *pur 'to scratch'
 *s-nan 'seize'
 *p-yet 'sell'
 *s-priŋ 'send'
 *ruhp 'sew'
 *p-yen 'shave'
 *gap 'shoot'
 *s-tən 'show'
 *kok 'skin, peel'
 *phyak 'snap'
 *tshim 'soak'
 *was 'sow seed'
 *khəl 'spin wool'
 *p-si 'split firewood'
 *tser 'squeeze'
 *ku 'steal'
 *rok 'to ransack, rummage'
 *r-wal 'stir'
 *on 'stop'
 *sit 'sweep'
 *p-sik ~ *p-sis 'teach'
 *p-tsit 'tear'
 *khya 'throw'
 *s-ki 'tie'
 *s-to 'trade'
 *kil 'twist'
 *s-krup 'unfold'
 *bohk 'uproot'
 *tse 'wash'
 *r-za 'to wash hair'
 *rəhk 'weave'
 *rihn 'to set up a loom'
 *hul 'whet'

References

Further reading 
 Dictionary: (Takale dialect) Watters, David E. 2004. A dictionary of Kham: Taka dialect (A Tibeto-Burman language of Nepal). Kirtipur: Tribhuvan University.
 Dictionary: (Gamal dialect) List of Gamale Kham words at Wiktionary, the free dictionary.
 Grammar: Watters, David E.. (2002). A grammar of Kham. Cambridge: Cambridge University.
 Verbal Morphology: (Gamal dialect) Moore, Glen M.. (2020). A Description of Selected Aspects of Gamale Kham Verbal Morphology. 
 Verbal Morphology: Rempt, Boudewijn. (1994). The verbal agreement system of four Khām languages. Linguistics of the Tibeto-Burman Area 17. 1-59.
 Phonology: (Gamal dialect) Wilde, Christopher P. (2017). A Phonological Comparison of Gamale, Sheram and Ghusbang – Three Kham Varieties. JSEALS Volume 10.1.
 Sociolinguistic Study: Watters, Stephen. (2018). Linguistic identity and dialect diversity: A conundrum with regard to Magar Kham. Language and identity in a multilingual, migrating world. SIL International.
 Sociolinguistic Study: (Western Parbate dialect): Leman, Joseph D. (2019). “Sociolinguistic Profile of Maikoti Kham: A sociolinguistic study of the Kham language spoken in the area of Maikot village in East Rukum District of Nepal.” Journal of Language Survey Reports. SIL International.

External links 

 YouVersion Bible: (Takale dialect) https://my.bible.com/bible/2495/LUK.1.NKham
 PDF Bible: (Takale dialect) https://magarkham.org/en/nt-bible
 YouTube documentary: https://www.youtube.com/watch?v=9CNs1KQUPfA
 YouTube Channels:
 https://www.youtube.com/user/Lugumyals
 https://www.youtube.com/c/lajimbudha
 https://www.youtube.com/channel/UC3VmS8h3KatE80fRD2_YKFQ
 https://www.youtube.com/channel/UCm7nYKAwSsj9niUcs6TQK2w

Languages of Nepal
Magaric languages
Sino-Tibetan languages
Languages of Gandaki Province
Languages of Lumbini Province